The Women's 100 metre backstroke event at the 2010 Commonwealth Games took place on 5 and 6 October 2010, at the SPM Swimming Pool Complex.

Four heats were held, with both containing the seven swimmers. The heat in which a swimmer competed did not formally matter for advancement, as the swimmers with the top sixteen times advanced to the semifinals and the top eight times from there qualified for the finals.

Heats

Heat 1

Heat 2

Heat 3

Heat 4

Semifinals

Semifinal 1

Semifinal 2

Final

References

Aquatics at the 2010 Commonwealth Games
2010 in women's swimming